P. canadensis may refer to:
 Pachyrhinosaurus canadensis, a ceratopsid dinosaur species from the Late Cretaceous period of North America
 Papilio canadensis, the Canadian tiger swallowtail, a butterfly species found in North America
 Pedicularis canadensis, the wood betony, beefsteak plant, Canadian lousewort, high heal-all, snaffles or Canada lousewort, a flowering plant species found throughout North America
 Perisoreus canadensis, the gray jay, grey jay, Canada jay or Whiskey Jack, a bird species found in the boreal forests across North America
 Polistes canadensis, the red paper wasp, a Neotropical eusocial wasp
 Polymnia canadensis, the whiteflower leafcup, a flowering plant species native to eastern North America from Ontario south to Alabama and from Kansas east to Vermont and Connecticut

See also
 Canadensis (disambiguation)